Ihlamur Palace, is a former imperial Ottoman summer pavilion located in Istanbul, Turkey. It was constructed during the reign of Sultan Abdülmecid I (1839-1860). It is under the administration of the Turkish Directorate of National Palaces.

Image gallery

Literature 
 Sema Öner. Ihlamur Pavilion. TBMM, Istanbul, 1994.

External links 

 Directorate of National Palaces | Ihlamur Pavilion

Ottoman palaces in Istanbul
Museums in Istanbul
Şişli
Historic house museums in Turkey